Shane Vanderson (born May 26, 1981) is a retired professional racquetball player. Vanderson was the International Racquetball Tour's (IRT's) #5 player at the end of three seasons: 2006-07, 2007–08, 2009-10. Vanderson finished in the IRT's top 10 for ten consecutive seasons. A native of Ohio, Vanderson was known for having one of the best backhands in racquetball.

Professional career 
Vanderson began playing the IRT full-time in 2003-04. That year he made it to the semi-finals of the  US Open, defeating Cliff Swain in the Round of 16 and Chris Crowther in the   quarter finals before losing to Derek Robinson in four games. He was ranked 10th at the end of that season, and was in the top 10 in each of the ten seasons he was on tour. Those ten seasons in the top 10 put him 7th all time.

The next season, 2004–05, Vanderson made two finals. In February 2005, he was in the San Diego Open final, losing to Swain in four games, and then in April 2005 Vanderson made the Red Swain Memorial final in Boston, where he lost to Jack Huczek in four games.

Vanderson made it to the semi-finals 19 times, including three consecutive US Open semi-finals in 2006, 2007 and 2008, but not to another final.

International and domestic career 
Vanderson was on Team USA five times, highlighted by winning the World Championship in Men's Doubles with Mike Dennison in 2004, when they defeated  Javier Moreno and Polo Gutierrez of Mexico in the final in Anyang, South Korea. Vanderson was also part of the American men's team that won gold that year at Worlds.

Vanderson was a silver medalist in singles at the 2006 World Championships  in Santo Domingo, Dominican Republic, losing to fellow American Jack Huczek in the final.

Vanderson and Dennison both played singles and doubles at the 2004 Pan American Championships. Vanderson was a bronze medalist in singles and silver medalist in doubles.

Vanderson also played singles for USA in the 2005 Pan Am Championships in Caracas, Venezuela, where he lost in the quarter finals to Mexican Gilberto Meija.

Vanderson's last appearance on Team USA was at the 2011 Pan Am Games in Guadalajara, Mexico, and he was a double medalist: bronze with Chris Crowther in men's doubles, and silver in the men's team competition.

While attending Baldwin Wallace College, Vanderson was the USA Racquetball Intercollegiate Singles Champion in 2001, and Doubles Champion in 2002 and 2003 with Andy Hawthorne.

Also, Vanderson was World Junior Champion in Boys U18 in 2000, as well as being US Junior Champion in Boys U18 Doubles in 2000 with Stephen Lewis, and World Junior Champion in U18 Doubles with Lewis in 1999.

Personal life
Vanderson graduated from Baldwin Wallace College in 2003 with a Degree in Business, and currently resides in Tampa, Florida.

Vanderson is currently a real estate agent with Engel & Völkers in Tampa, FL.

See also 
 List of racquetball players

References

External links 
 IRT Website

1981 births
Living people
American racquetball players
Baldwin Wallace University alumni
Sportspeople from Columbus, Ohio
Racquetball players at the 2011 Pan American Games
Pan American Games silver medalists for the United States
Pan American Games bronze medalists for the United States
Pan American Games medalists in racquetball
Medalists at the 2011 Pan American Games